VDM-11 is a potent cannabinoid reuptake inhibitor. It is light-sensitive and must be stored within an inert gas such as argon, in a dark place and at an ideal temperature of -49°C. This gold-colored substance is rarely found outside of research laboratories.

See also
 AM-404

References

Anilides
Phenols
Cannabinoids
Fatty acid amides
Endocannabinoid reuptake inhibitors
Arachidonyl compounds